The I SS Panzer Corps was a German armoured corps of the Waffen-SS. It saw action on both the Western and Eastern Fronts during World War II.

Formation and training
The corps was raised on 26 July 1943 in Berlin-Lichterfeld, with initial mustering taking place on the Truppenübungsplatz at Beverloo, in occupied Belgium. SS-Obergruppenführer Sepp Dietrich, previously the commander of the SS Division Leibstandarte (LSSAH), became the corps' first commander.

In August 1943, the corps was transferred to Meran in Italy, where it took part in operations to disarm Italian troops. After this, the corps continued its training, being sporadically engaged in anti-partisan operations in northern Italy. By December 1943, the corps was fully formed and deemed ready for action, with its HQ being set up in Brussels in early 1944.

Operational history

Western Front: Normandy
In April 1944, the corps was moved to Septeuil, to the west of Paris, where it was assigned the SS Division Leibstandarte, SS Division Hitlerjugend, Panzer-Lehr-Division and the SS Division Götz von Berlichingen. The corps was attached to the 5th Panzer Army, the Western theatre's armoured reserve.

With the launch of Operation Overlord, the allied invasion of France on 6 June 1944, the corps was ordered to Falaise. The Hitlerjugend Division engaged British and Canadian troops to the north of Caen on 8 June. The corps was tasked with holding the area of Caen and saw heavy fighting around the villages of Authie, Buron, and the airport at Carpiquet.

After the launch of Operation Cobra, which destroyed the remnants of the Panzer-Lehr-Division, the corps was ordered to take part in Operation Lüttich, the abortive counter-offensive towards Avranches. The corps was caught in the Falaise pocket, where it fought to maintain a corridor for the trapped German forces, losing all its armour and equipment in the process. After the collapse of the front, the corps retreated to the Franco-German border.

Battle of the Bulge
In early October 1944, the corps was pulled back from the front line for rest and refit in Westfalen. Refitting was complete by early December, and it was ordered to the Ardennes region to join Sepp Dietrich's 6th Panzer Army, in preparation for an offensive codenamed Wacht Am Rhein, and the ensuing Battle of the Bulge. The corps played a major role in the battle with Kampfgruppe Peiper of the Leibstandarte forming a mobile spearhead.  After several weeks heavy fighting with severely limited fuel supplies, and heavy Allied air attacks, the corps was exhausted. The offensive had to be called off. Kampfgruppe Peiper became infamous during the battle for the murder of U.S. prisoners of war in what became known as the Malmedy massacre. In the wake of the defeat, the corps along with the remainder of Dietrich's Army, was moved to Hungary.

Hungary and Austria
The corps, composed of LSSAH and Hitlerjugend SS divisions, was instrumental in one of the last successful German offensives, Operation Southwind, eliminating the Soviet bridgehead west of the Garam in February 1945. The Germans then launched a pincer movement north and south of Lake Balaton as part of Operation Spring Awakening on 6 March, 1945. This area included some of the last oil reserves still available to the Axis. The attack was spearheaded by the 6th SS Panzer Army and included the corps, made up of elite units such as the LSSAH and Hitlerjugend divisions. Dietrich's army made "good progress" at first, but as they drew near the Danube, the combination of the muddy terrain and strong Soviet resistance ground them to a halt. On 16 March, the Soviet forces counterattacked in strength, which forced the entire southern front to retreat towards Vienna. The German forces, including the LSSAH and the Hitlerjugend divisions, could not hold the city of Vienna, which fell to the Soviet forces on 13 April. The Germans units then retreated into Hungary. Thereafter, the bulk of the LSSAH surrendered to US forces near Steyr and the SS Division Hitlerjugend surrendered to US troops near the town of Enns, Austria on 8 May 1945.

Commanders
 SS-Oberstgruppenführer Josef Dietrich (4 July 1943 – 9 August 1944)
 SS-Brigadeführer Fritz Kraemer (9 – 16 August 1944)
 SS-Obergruppenführer Georg Keppler (16 August 1944 – 30 October 1944)
 SS-Gruppenführer Hermann Priess (30 October 1944 – 8 May 1945)

Orders of battle
6 June 1944 (Normandy)
  101st SS Heavy Panzer Battalion
  1st SS Panzer Division Leibstandarte SS Adolf Hitler
  12th SS Panzer Division Hitlerjugend
  SS Division Götz von Berlichingen
  Panzer Lehr Division

16 December 1944 (Battle of the Bulge)
  101st SS Heavy Panzer Battalion
  1st SS Panzer Division Leibstandarte SS Adolf Hitler
  12th SS Panzer Division Hitlerjugend
  3rd Parachute Division
  12th Volksgrenadier Division
  277th Infantry Division

3 March 1945 (build-up for Operation Spring Awakening)
  1st SS Panzer Division Leibstandarte SS Adolf Hitler
 1st SS Panzer Regiment
 501st Heavy SS Panzer Battalion (2nd battalion of the 1st SS Panzer Regiment) 
 1st SS Panzerjäger Battalion
 1st SS Panzergrenadier Battalion
 2nd SS Panzergrenadier Battalion
  12th SS Panzer Division Hitlerjugend
 12th SS Panzer Regiment
 25th SS Panzergrenadier Regiment
 26th SS Panzergrenadier Regiment
 12th SS Panzerjäger Battalion
 560th Heavy Panzerjäger Battalion

References

Citations

Bibliography
 
 
 
 
 
 
 
 

Waffen-SS corps
German units in Normandy
Military units and formations established in 1943
Military units and formations disestablished in 1945